Alvadı may refer to:
Köhnə Alvadı ("Old Alvadı"), Azerbaijan
Təzə Alvadı ("New Alvadı"), Azerbaijan